Santiuse Kujur (born 26 October 1973 Village Khokhabasti, Udalguri district, Assam) is an Indian social worker, politician and a Member of Parliament (Rajya Sabha) elected from Assam, India being an INC candidate.

He has completed BA From Gauhati University in the year 1995.He joined Bharatiya Janata Party in 2019.

References

Living people
Rajya Sabha members from Assam
1973 births
People from Udalguri district
Indian National Congress politicians from Assam
Adivasi politicians